IBK Sundsvall was a floorball club in Sundsvall, Sweden, established in 1986. The men's team played in the Swedish top division during the 1990s. In 2006, the club merged with IBK Nordic becoming Sundsvall City.

In 1991 the club also played soccer in the men's Division 6.

References

1986 establishments in Sweden
2006 disestablishments in Sweden
Sport in Sundsvall
Sports clubs established in 1986
Sports clubs disestablished in 2006
Swedish floorball teams